Asim Kurjak is the President of International Academy of Perinatal Medicine and director of Ian Donald Inter-University School of Medical Ultrasound. He is a regular fellow of World Academy of Art and Science, European Academy of Sciences and Art, International Academy for Human Reproduction, Italian Academy of Science and Art of Reggio Puglia, Academy of Medical Sciences of Catalonia; honorary member of American Institute of Ultrasound in Medicine and Biology; regular member of Russian Academy of Science and Art.

Awards
The Fetus as a Patient Society's Prize "William Liley (1998)
Maternity Prize given by European Association of Perinatal Medicine (2000)
The Order of the Croatian Starr with the Effigy of Rudjer Boskovic (2001)
Pavao Culumovic Prize of Croatian Medical Association (2003)
Golden Amnioscope given by International Academy of Perinatal Medicine (2008)
Erich Saling Perinatal Price (2012)
Rudjer Boskovic National Price for Science of Croatia (2012)

He is an honorary member of 28 international societies for ultrasound or perinatal medicine. Kurjak is also a member of the editorial board or editor in chief of several international journals including Donald School Journal of Ultrasound in Obstetrics and Gynecology, co editors of Journal of Perinatal Medicine.

Plagiarism
Kurjak has been accused of multiple instances of plagiarism. In May 2007, the Committee for Ethics in Science and Higher Education found Kurjak guilty of “violations of the [committee's] ethics code . . . and of common norms in biomedical publishing.”

References
http://www.asim-kurjak.com/index.html

1942 births
Living people
Bosniaks of Bosnia and Herzegovina
People from Kotor Varoš
Bosnia and Herzegovina gynaecologists
Members of the European Academy of Sciences and Arts